Robert Cohen (15 November 1930 – 2 March 2022) was a French boxer. Cohen was world bantamweight champion from 1954 to 1956. He was managed by Robert (Bobby) Diamond, and Gaston Charles-Raymond.

Early life and amateur career
Cohen was born in Bône, a port city in French Algeria, on 15 November 1930 to a Sephardi Jewish family in a French territory that would soon suffer from the shadow of the Pro-Nazi Vichy regime. Though the family survived the Holocaust, Cohen's father had little wish for his son to pursue a career in boxing. Robert would sometimes escape the house using the window to watch his older brother Léon earn a living boxing. Entering the French Amateur Championships after winning an Algerian title in 1950, he was beaten in the finals by Jacques Dumesnil. The following year he lost the finals again to Joseph Perez, but caught the attention of European promoter Charles Raymond who offered to manage him.

Professional career
Cohen, who at 5' 3-1/2", was a short but muscular champion, won the French bantamweight title in November 1953 and the European championship in January 1954.

Between September 1951 and May 1954, Cohen won a remarkable 34 of 37 fights, losing only one to Robert Munier in Paris, France, and drawing twice.

On 20 October 1952, he defeated Theo Medina in a ten-round points decision in Paris. Andre Valignat fell to Cohen on November 17, 1952 in another ten round points decision.
Cohen upset Jean Snyers, winning a ten-round points decision in Paris on 23 February 1953. 

He defeated Pappy Gault on 15 April 1953 in a ten-round points decision in Paris, before a crowd of 8,000.

French and European bantam champ
On 6 November 1953, Cohen defeated French bantamweight champion Maurice Sandeyron easily taking the title in a fifteen-round bout in Paris, having beaten Sandeyron earlier on 19 January in a ninth-round knockout in a non-title bout.  A religious Jew, one source noted that he briefly attended a Synagogue the morning of the match.

Cohen defeated Jake Tuli on 14 December 1953, in Manchester, Lancashire, England, in ten rounds.

Before a crowd of 20,000, on 27 February 1954, Cohen took the European Bantamweight Title, defeating John Kelly in a third-round knockout in Belfast, County Down, Northern Ireland, Ulster. Cohen knocked Kelly to the mat for counts of four, seven and six in the second round.  Kelly was down again at the end of the second from a right hook shortly before the bell.  Thirty seconds into the third, Kelly went down for the full count from a right to the jaw.

World bantam champ
On 19 September 1954, he won the vacant World bantamweight title in a fifteen-round split decision in Bangkok, Thailand, against police Lieutenant Chamroem Songkitrat. An enormous crowd of 60,000 that included the King and Queen of Thailand watched the bloody contest. Cohen was left with a badly sprained or broken wrist in the fifth and his opponent with a broken nose. Cohen was formerly the European Bantamweight Champion. Later that year, his marriage took place at the Synagogue de la rue des Tournelles, in Paris, presided by Rabbi David Feuerwerker.

On 20 December 1954, he defeated Roy Ankrah in a fourth-round technical knockout in Paris.

Stripped of World bantam title
On 23 December 1954, Cohen was stripped of his title by the National Boxing Association for failing to defend it within 90 days against Raul "Raton" Macias.  Few sanctioning bodies other than the NBA recognized Macias as the World Champion. Both the New York State Athletic Commission and the European Boxing Union continued to recognize Cohen as champion. 
On 11 December 1955 Cohen lost in a ten-round technical knockout against French featherweight champion Cherif Hamia before a crowd of 14,000. Cohen was down for an eight count in the second from a right cross to the jaw and was down again in the seventh from a right hook.  The referee ended the bout 1:27 into the tenth round, when Cohen's left brow was injured by a left from Hamia.  Some time after the bout, Cohen was severely injured in an automobile accident, and suffered a broken jaw. He attempted to defend his title, but the injury shortened his career.

On 3 September 1955, he drew with Willie Toweel in a fifteen-round world bantamweight title bout in Johannesburg, South Africa. Cohen dropped Toweel three times in the second and put him down for a no count in the tenth. Toweel had never been knocked to the mat in a previous bout. In a brutal bout, Cohen was deeply fatigued by the end of the match.

Cohen lost a title bout to Mario D'Agata on 29 June 1956 before a crowd of 38,000, in a seventh-round technical knockout in Rome. D'Agata dropped Cohen to the mat for a nine count near the end of the sixth. After the sixth ended, the referee stopped the fight due to a serious gash over the left brow of Cohen. D'Agata appeared superior in the in-fighting, and many of Cohen's blows were wide of his mark. America's National Boxing Association (NBA) did not recognize the match as a title bout, though nearly every other world boxing organization did. Only a year and a half earlier, D'Agata had been injured by a shotgun blast.

His professional record over 43 bouts was 36 wins (14 KOs), 4 losses, and 3 draws.

Life after boxing
Cohen retired after his fight with Mario D'Agata, and a comeback attempt three years later against Peter Locke in July 1959.

Suffering from injuries, he retired from boxing in the 1960s, and moved with his wife, Zita, to the Congo-Brazzaville and began working in his father-in-law's textile and retail business. Unhappy in the textile business, he opened a boxing gym with some success, but his best boxers left for Europe after it was nationalized, and he left the gym. 

In the 1980s Cohen managed a textile import and export business in Brussels, Belgium.

His biography, Gambuch, a book written by Michel Rosenzweig was published in 2012 by the widely-known French publisher L'Harmattan. A movie of Cohen's life, produced by Shanghai-based Italian entrepreneur Jonathan L. Hasson, was in production in 2012.

Cohen died on 2 March 2022, at the age of 91.

Hall of Fame
Cohen, who was Jewish, was inducted into the International Jewish Sports Hall of Fame in 1988.

Professional boxing record

See also
 List of bantamweight boxing champions
 List of select Jewish boxers

References

External links
 BoxRec bio
 When a Cohen was the world champion boxer at The Jewish Chronicle
 
 Robert Cohen - CBZ Profile

1930 births
2022 deaths
Jewish French sportspeople
Bantamweight boxers
Jewish boxers
World bantamweight boxing champions
World boxing champions
French male boxers
French people of Algerian-Jewish descent
Algerian emigrants to Belgium
People from Annaba